Dale White (born 17 March 1968) is an English former professional footballer who played as a forward for Sunderland.

References

1968 births
Living people
Footballers from Sunderland
English footballers
Association football forwards
Sunderland A.F.C. players
Peterborough United F.C. players
Gateshead F.C. players
Wollongong Wolves FC players
English Football League players